Fangchenggang Nuclear Power Plant, also known as Fangchenggang Hongsha Nuclear Power Plant ( 防城港红沙核电站 ), is a nuclear power plant in Fangchenggang, near Hongshacun Village ( 红沙村 ), autonomous region of Guangxi (Guangxi Zhuang Autonomous Region) in the People's Republic of China. A total of six reactors are planned to operate at the Fangchenggang site. Units 1 and 2 are both CPR-1000s, units 3–4 are Hualong Ones, units 5–6 are planned also to be Hualong One reactors. Fangchenggang 3 and 4 will be the reference plant for the proposed Bradwell B plant in the UK.

The plant is located about 54 kilometres from the border with Vietnam. It is a project of Guangxi Fangchenggang Nuclear Power Group, a joint venture between China Guangdong Nuclear Power Co (CGNPC) and Guangxi Investment Group.

Unit 1 was connected to the electricity grid on 25 October 2015. Unit 1 is commercially operating starting on 1 January 2016.

Construction works for Unit 3 started in December 2015. Unit 3 first concrete pour occurred on 24 December 2015. 
First concrete for Unit 4 followed one year later, on 23 December 2016.

Reactor data
The Fangchenggang Nuclear Power Plant consist of 2 operational reactors, 2 reactors under construction, and 2 reactors planned.

See also

Generation III reactor

References

Nuclear power stations in China
Buildings and structures in Guangxi
2015 establishments in China
Buildings and structures under construction in China
Nuclear power stations with reactors under construction